Maryland Route 254 (MD 254) is a state highway in the U.S. state of Maryland.  Known as Cobb Island Road, the state highway runs  from Cobb Island north to MD 257 near Rock Point.  MD 254 connects the mainland to Cobb Island, which was originally established as a summer resort in the early 1920s, at the southern end of Charles County.  The state highway was constructed as Maryland Route 533 in the early 1930s.  The state highway was rebuilt and renumbered as MD 254 in the 1950s.

Route description

Cobb Island Road continues south as a county-maintained two-lane divided avenue to Potomac River Drive on the Potomac River side of the island. North of Neale Sound Drive, MD 254 is a two-lane undivided road and leaves the island by crossing over Neale Sound on the Cobb Island Bridge. The state highway passes between marinas and curves northwest to parallel the coast. At Pine Grove Road, MD 254 veers north to its terminus at Rock Point Road. Rock Point Road heads southeast as a county highway toward Rock Point and northwest as MD 257 up Cobb Neck to U.S. Route 301 in Newburg.

History

The original bridge from the mainland to Cobb Island, a "noisy one-way wooden bridge that was prone to summer traffic jams," was constructed in 1923 shortly after the establishment of the island as a summer resort by Robert Crain. In 1932, the Maryland State Roads Commission rebuilt Cobb Island Road as a modern gravel road and replaced the "hazardous" 1923 bridge with a creosoted timber bridge. Cobb Island Road was originally designated MD 533. MD 533 was renumbered MD 254 in 1958. MD 254 had originally been assigned to Davidsonville Road between Davidsonville and Edgewater in central Anne Arundel County; that highway was renumbered as an eastward extension of MD 214 (Central Avenue) by 1939. A two-lane steel girder Cobb Island Bridge was built in 1963. In 2015, plans were made to construct a new Cobb Island Bridge to replace the existing structure that was structurally deficient. The new Cobb Island Bridge, which includes wider travel lanes, a sidewalk, and lighting, cost $18 million to build and opened to traffic on April 28, 2020.

Junction list

See also

References

External links

MD 254 @ MDRoads.com

254
Maryland Route 254